Stoney Grove Strikers, known as BAS Stoney Grove Strikers for sponsorship reasons, is a Nevisian association football club based in Charlestown. The team is the second most successful team in the Nevis Premier Division winning the title twice.

Roster 
 Delroy Arthurton
 Dequani Newton
 Kester Evans
 Don Dyer
 Naheem Liburd

Honors 
 Nevis Premier Division: 2
2006–07, 2009–10

References 

Stony Grove Strikers